Belarusian Universal Commodity Exchange (BUCE) (full name: Open Joint-Stock Company Belarusian Universal Commodity Exchange) is the only commodity exchange in the Republic of Belarus and one of the largest in Eastern Europe. The BUCE is an open joint-stock company with the controlling stake (98%) owned by the government.

Founded in 2004, BUCE now has 29,000 registered members from 70 countries, including 6000 foreign companies. BUCE head office is located in Minsk with branches in all five of the country's regional centers: Brest, Gomel, Grodno, Mogilev and Vitebsk. The BUCE also has exchange brokers in China, Estonia, Germany, Israel, Latvia, Lithuania, Russia, and Poland.

History 
Belarusian Universal Commodity Exchange was incorporated on May 25, 2004. BUCE was created under the initiative of the country’s president, Alexander Lukashenko, by Council of Ministers Resolution No. 1719 of 30 December 2003.

The first trading session, to sell timber, took place on June 2, 2005; the trade in metal products began on June 29, 2005. In Q4 2005 the commodity exchange started preparing to sell agricultural products, and launched agricultural sales in January 2006. In May 2009, an online trading platform for industrial and consumer goods was launched.

In December 2010, BUCE was authorized to hold electronic auctions under government procurement contracts. In November 2012, BUCE started trading derivatives.

Administration 
BUCE is operating under direct supervision of a Board of Directors. In between general meetings of shareholders BUCE is managed by the Supervisory Board headed by the Minister of Antimonopoly Regulation and Trade of the Republic of Belarus. He is the government’s representative at the commodity exchange. Following the relevant resolution of the Council of Ministers, a Coordinating Council for Exchange Trade led by Vice Premier of Belarus was set up. The Council consists of the heads of Belarus’ key ministries.

Objectives and functions 
BUCE's objectives:
improving the mechanism of government regulation in domestic and foreign trade;
developing a formal wholesale market;
providing equal access to the market;
offering additional economic incentives to market agents;
assisting the development of an organized commodity market;
increasing the efficiency of the Belarusian export;
simplifying the search for sellers and buyers;
creating a trading mechanism that allows for transparent execution of transactions on the commodity exchange.

BUCE's functions: 
creating conditions for carrying out exchange auctions;
conducting exchange auctions;
registering transactions at the exchange;
arranging quality inspection of the exchange goods;
identifying the supply and demand for various goods.

Key business areas 
Electronic trade in metals and articles thereof;
Electronic trade in timber and articles thereof;
Electronic trade in agricultural products;
Electronic trade in industrial and consumer products;
Electronic procurement;
Electronic property trading;
Arbitration;
Publishing.

Structure and product range 
BUCE comprises five commodity sections:
Metals and articles thereof;
Timber and articles thereof;
Agricultural products;
Industrial and consumer goods;
Promising commodities

These sections conduct trading sessions to sell a wide range of commodity items. The major ones are ferrous and non-ferrous metals and articles made thereof, scrap metal and metal byproducts, coal, coke, cables and wires (metal products section), standing timber, round timber, timber, plywood and flake boards, paper and pasteboard (timber products section), hard cheese, milk powder, casein, butter, rapeseed oil, sunflower and soy oil cakes, rawhides (agricultural products section), industrial machinery, electronics, etc. (industrial and consumer products section). Every day the BUCE hosts five to seven trading sessions.

Futures market 
BUCE's futures market section is currently suspended. Three futures contracts were available for trading - a futures contract for hot rolled steel coils, a futures contract for steel bars and a futures contract for petroleum products price index (calculated by Saint-Petersburg International Mercantile Exchange). Trade statistics are regularly published on BUCE website.

International relations 
BUCE is a member of several international organizations. In 2008 it joined the International Association of Exchanges of the CIS (IAE CIS), and in 2011 it acceded to the Association of Futures Markets (AFM). The BUCE also maintains partner relations with Moscow Interbank Currency Exchange, Moscow stock exchange, Uzbek Commodity Exchange, Kiev Agronomic Industry Exchange, the Russian Union of Metal and Steel Suppliers, etc.

References

External links 
Official website of the Belarusian Universal Commodity Exchange (BUCE)

Commodity exchanges
Government agencies established in 2004
Belarusian companies established in 2004
Financial services companies established in 2004